Donovan Edwards (born February 25, 2003) is an American football running back for the Michigan Wolverines.

Early years and high school career
Edwards was born in 2003 in West Bloomfield, Michigan. His mother, Donna, died from cancer in 2005 when Donovan was two years old. He was raised by his father, Kevin Edwards Sr.

Edwards played high school football at West Bloomfield High School. As a senior in 2020, he rushed for 1,502 yards and 30 touchdowns and led West Bloomfield to the Division 1 state championship. In May 2021, he was honored as the 2020–21 Gatorade Michigan Football Player of the Year. He was also selected by the Detroit Free Press as the captain of its 2020 football dream team. He was rated as a five-star recruit by 247 Sports.

College career

In December 2020, Edwards committed to the University of Michigan. He announced the decision on ESPN, choosing Michigan over the University of Georgia, University of Notre Dame, and the University of Oklahoma. He enrolled early at Michigan in January 2021.

As a freshman during the 2021 season, Edwards rushed for 174 yards on eight carries and caught 20 passes for 265 yards. He scored his first two touchdowns against Northern Illinois on September 18. In the first half of the Big Ten Championship Game against Iowa on December 4, Edwards threw a 75-yard touchdown pass to Roman Wilson, after receiving a backward pass from quarterback Cade McNamara.

As a sophomore in 2022, Edwards rushed for 872 yards, added 192 receiving yards, and scored nine touchdowns. On October 26th, Edwards shared anti-Semitic opinions on Twitter. The team has not yet addressed this controversy. Against Ohio State on November 26, he rushed for 216 yards, including touchdown runs of 75 and 85 yards in the fourth quarter. In the Big Ten Championship game, he rushed for 185 yards and one touchdown against Purdue.

Statistics

References

External links

 Michigan Wolverines bio

2003 births
Living people
American football running backs
Michigan Wolverines football players
People from West Bloomfield, Michigan
Players of American football from Michigan